San Wai Tsai is a village in Tuen Mun District, Hong Kong.

Administration
San Wai Tsai is one of the 36 villages represented within the Tuen Mun Rural Committee. For electoral purposes, San Wai Tsai is part of the San Hui constituency, which was formerly represented by Cheung Ho-sum until May 2021.

See also
 San Wai Court

References

External links

 Delineation of area of existing village San Wai Tsai (Tuen Mun) for election of resident representative (2019 to 2022)

Villages in Tuen Mun District, Hong Kong